Clint Day served in the Georgia State Senate from 1993 to 1997 before mounting unsuccessful campaigns for the U.S. Senate and Lieutenant Governor. He was considered a social and fiscal conservative Republican, and is not the insurance agent Clint Day, another Atlanta business owner.

References

Year of birth missing (living people)
Living people
Republican Party Georgia (U.S. state) state senators
Conservatism in the United States